Amadu Yusufu (born 5 July 1958) is a Malawian former cyclist. He competed at the 1984 Summer Olympics and the 1988 Summer Olympics.

References

External links
 

1958 births
Living people
Malawian male cyclists
Olympic cyclists of Malawi
Cyclists at the 1984 Summer Olympics
Cyclists at the 1988 Summer Olympics
Place of birth missing (living people)